The 2013–14 NBB season was the sixth season of the Novo Basquete Brasil, the Brazilian basketball league. This tournament was organized entirely by the Liga Nacional de Basquete (LNB). The NBB serves as a qualifying competition for international tournaments such as Liga Sudamericana and FIBA Americas League.

Seventeen teams playing each other in the regular season. At the end of the home and away matches round the top four teams qualified for the quarterfinals of the playoffs automatically, while the teams finishing in the 5th and 12th place participated in the first round of the playoffs to determine the other four teams in the quarterfinals, best of five matches, advances to the next phase who win three games.

For this season, the last two regular season placed was relegated to the newly created Liga Ouro, the NBB second division. The Liga Ouro winner receive the right to contest NBB in the next year.

Participating teams 
New teams in the league
Macaé Basquete (Promotion Tournament runners-up)
Universo/Goiânia (approved by the LNB)

Teams that left the league
Cia do Terno/Romaço/Joinville (withdrew due to financial troubles)
Tijuca/Rio de Janeiro (Promotion Tournament winner, withdrew due to financial troubles)
Suzano/Cesumar/Campestre (withdrew due to financial troubles)

1Vila Velha was renamed Espírito Santo from this season.

Managerial changes

Regular season

League table

Results

NBB All-Star Weekend 

This season, the All-Star Weekend was played at Ginásio Paulo Sarasate in Fortaleza, Ceará on February 21–22, 2014. In the first day of the event, it was disputed the "Dunk Tournament", "Three-Point Tournament", "Skills Challenge" and the newly "Shooting Stars Competition". The NBB All-Star Game was played on the following day and NBB Brasil defeated NBB Mundo for the third straight year (126–116).

Playoffs

First round

(5) Pinheiros vs. (12) Mogi das Cruzes 
Game 1

Game 2

Game 3

Game 4

(6) São José vs. (11) Palmeiras 
Game 1

Game 2

Game 3

Game 4

Game 5

(7) Uberlândia vs. (10) Franca 
Game 1

Game 2

Game 3

Game 4

Game 5

(8) Bauru vs. (9) Basquete Cearense 
Game 1

Game 2

Game 3

Quarterfinals

(1) Flamengo vs. (8) Bauru 
Game 1

Game 2

Game 3

Game 4

(4) Limeira vs. (12) Mogi das Cruzes 
Game 1

Game 2

Game 3

Game 4

Game 5

Notes

(2) Paulistano vs. (10) Franca 
Game 1

Game 2

Game 3

Game 4

Game 5

(3) Brasília vs. (6) São José 
Game 1

Game 2

Game 3

Notes

Semifinals

(1) Flamengo vs. (12) Mogi das Cruzes 
Game 1

Game 2

Game 3

Game 4

(2) Paulistano vs. (6) São José 
Game 1

Game 2

Game 3

Game 4

Game 5

Final

Statistical leaders

Individual tournament highs

Points

Rebounds

Assists

Blocks

Steals

Efficiency

Awards

NBB All-Team

Individual awards 
 MVP – David Jackson (Limeira)
 Sixth Player – Hélio Lima (Limeira)
 Best Defender – Alex Garcia (Brasília)
 Revelation – Henrique Coelho (Minas)
 Most Improved Player – Paulão Prestes (Franca)
 Coach – Gustavo de Conti (Paulistano)
 MVP of the Final – Jerome Meyinsse (Flamengo)

References

External links

 

2013-14
NBB
Brazil